Waipuke Beach is a beach between McDonald and Caughley Beaches, lying 6 nautical miles (11 km) southwest of Cape Bird on Ross Island. So named by the New Zealand Geological Survey Antarctic Expedition (NZGSAE), 1958–59, because of periodic flooding by meltwater from the Cape Bird icecap, which has been destructive to nearby penguin rookeries. Waipuke is the Maori word for flood.

Beaches of Antarctica
Landforms of Ross Island